Mary Paula Kebirungi Turyahikayo also known as Turyahikayo Kebirungi Mary Paula (born 15 January 1961) is a Ugandan politician and Social Scientist. She is the woman Member of Parliament representative for Rubabo County, Rukungiri District under the National Resistance Movement political party ticket. She was the aspirant for 2021-2026 Mp for Rubabo county but  lost the election with only  20,287 votes.

Education background 
In 1974, she joined St Theresa Primary School for her Primary Leaving Examinations and later joined Immaculate Heart Girls Senior Secondary School to obtain her Uganda Certificate of Education in 1978. She was awarded Uganda Advanced Certificate of Education from Kibuli S.S in 1980 and was admitted at Makerere University to acquire her bachelor's degree of Arts in Social Sciences (Political Science, Sociology) in 1984. In 1997, she had a Postgraduate Certificate in Management from Uganda Management Institute. Mary later returned to Uganda Management Institute to acquire her Post graduate Diploma in Management (2000) and Master of Public Health Leadership(2009).

Career before politics 
She was the Teacher/ Head, History Department at Baptist High School, Mombasa, Kenya(1986-1988) and Afraha High School, Nakuru, Kenya (1988-1990). In 1994, she joined Africa Science Technology Exchange as the Programme Associate and later joined Ministry of Health and served as the Administrator (1998-2004) and Assistant Coordinator, Public Sector(2004-2005). She was also employed as the Assistant Public Sector Coordinator for the Global Fund to fight AIDS, TB, Malaria (2004 - 2005) and Research Assistant at African Energy Policy Research Network, and a History and Geography teacher in Kenyan schools.

Political life 
From 2006 to 2021, she served as the Member of Parliament at the Parliament of Uganda in the eighth, ninth and tenth Parliament. She defeated Makerere University Chancellor and former minister, Prof. Mondo Kagonyera, to become Rubabo MP in 2001.

While at the Parliament of Uganda, she served on additional roles  as the member on Committee on Commissions, State Authorities and State Enterprises and Business Committee.

Personal life 
She is married. Her hobbies are Listening to Gospel, Visiting friends, Travelling and Debating. She has special interests in Promoting health services and Youth women empowerment.

See also 

 Rukungiri District
 List of members of the tenth Parliament of Uganda
 List of members of the eighth Parliament of Uganda
 List of members of the ninth Parliament of Uganda
 National Resistance Movement
 Parliament of Uganda
 Member of Parliament

References

External links 
 

Living people
1961 births
National Resistance Movement politicians
Uganda Management Institute alumni
Makerere University alumni
Members of the Parliament of Uganda
Women members of the Parliament of Uganda